Chris Janson is the debut EP by American country music artist Chris Janson. It was released on September 3, 2013 via Bigger Picture Music Group.

Critical reception
Matt Bjorke of Roughstock gave the album a positive review, saying that "Chris Janson EP is something any true fan of Country Music should want to buy to help support Real Country Music."

Track listing

Chart performance

References

2013 debut EPs
Chris Janson EPs
Bigger Picture Music Group albums
Albums produced by Keith Stegall